Donatella Dal Bianco (born 7 November 1968) is a former Italian sprint athlete.

Her best result at international level was the 7th place in the 4×100 metres relay at 1991 World Championships in Tokyo.

Biography
She won three medals, to senior level, two of these with the national relay team at the International athletics competitions. She has 12 caps in national team from 1987 to 1995.

Achievements

National titles
Donatella Dal Bianco has won 3 times the individual national championship.
3 wins in the 200 metres indoor (1990, 1992, 1995)

See also
 Italy national relay team

References

External links
 

1968 births
Living people
Italian female sprinters
Mediterranean Games silver medalists for Italy
Mediterranean Games bronze medalists for Italy
Athletes (track and field) at the 1991 Mediterranean Games
Athletes (track and field) at the 1993 Mediterranean Games
World Athletics Championships athletes for Italy
Mediterranean Games medalists in athletics
People from Schio
Sportspeople from the Province of Vicenza
20th-century Italian women
21st-century Italian women